is a Japanese football player, who last played for Iwate Grulla Morioka.

Playing career
Takeda was born in Wakayama Prefecture on October 12, 1995. After graduating from Tokai Gakuen University, he joined J2 League club Fagiano Okayama in 2018. His contract got extended in December 2018. He joined Iwate Grulla Morioka in 2021, who were at the time playing at the J3 League. In 2022, the club joined the J2 League, but he didn't play any matches in the referred season. He then, stayed at Iwate for a season and a half between 2021 and 2022, before having his contract terminated in a mutual agreement on July, at the 2022 mid-season.

References

External links

1995 births
Living people
Tokai Gakuen University alumni
Association football people from Wakayama Prefecture
Japanese footballers
J2 League players
Fagiano Okayama players
Iwate Grulla Morioka players
Association football forwards